Aga Bai Arrechha!  is a Marathi comedy drama film by director Kedar Shinde loosely based on the Hollywood film What Women Want. It was released in 2004. The film highlights the life and the problems of a common man living in a metropolitan city like Mumbai. His greatest desire in life is to answer the question "What do women want?" He is then blessed by the Kuldevi (Clan Goddess) of his village and gets a special "ear" for the internal dialogues of the women around him. It highlights his transition from a frustrated individual to someone who is happy, content and in charge of his life. The film also had a sequel titled Aga Bai Arechyaa 2, which was not a commercial success.

The songs from the film have become particularly popular. The film was remade in Kannada as Vaare Vah, starring Komal.

Plot
Shriranga Deshmukh (or Ranga) is a frustrated man. His frustration is particularly towards the women in his life—his wife, his mother and particularly his ever-angry boss. He feels they are in control of his life. During a trip to his native village, Ranga participates in an annual festival. During this trip he discovers that he has now gained the ability to listen to women's thoughts.

At first, he is confused. But soon, on being counseled by a female psychologist, he learns to look at his abilities as a gift instead of a curse. From that point onward, the insight into the female mind helps him understand the women around him. It helps him see their frustrations and dilemmas brought on by everyday life.

Being good at heart, he slowly starts using this understanding to improve his relationship with his wife, mother, grandmother, his boss and even his father. He is also able to solve some of their problems, making them happier than before. As an incentive, he saves the city by foiling the plans of a would-be female terrorist.

Cast
 Sanjay Narvekar as Shrirang Ganpat Deshmukh alias Ranga
 Priyanka Yadav as Suman Shrirang Deshmukh, Ranga's wife
 Dilip Prabhavalkar as Ganpat Deshmukh, Ranga's mute father
 Vimal Mhatre as Ranga's mother
 Rekha Kamat as Ranga's Grandmother
 Pallavi Vaidya as Ranga's sister
Siddharth Jadhav as Ranga's Chawl Friend
 Shubhangi Gokhale as Mrs. Benare, Ranga's boss
 Suhas Joshi as Ranga's Mother-in-law
 Tejaswini Pandit as Aapa
 Bharati Achrekar as Dr. Suhas Phadke, Ranga's psychiatrist
 Rasika Joshi as taxi driver
 Vijay Chavan as the peon in Mantralaya
 Hrishikesh Joshi as Ranga's Colleague
 Guru Thakur as  Ranga's Colleague
 Kshitee Jog as Ranga's Colleague
 Sandeep Pathak as Peon in Ranga Office
 Bharat Jadhav in Special Appearance
 Sonali Bendre in Special Appearance in an Item number "Cham Cham Karta Hai"

Soundtrack 
The soundtrack was produced by the musical duo of Ajay–Atul. The music of this movie almost breathes a new life to Marathi light music: The improvisation of the famous Durga Arti, the soul song "Mana Udhaan" and even the item number "Cham Cham karta", in which Sonali Bendre made a special appearance, which attracted much attention outside of Marathi film audience. The soundtrack was released by Sagarika Music.

Track listing

References

External links
 

2000s Marathi-language films
Films scored by Ajay–Atul
Indian comedy films
Marathi films remade in other languages
2004 comedy films
2004 films